This list of American films of 1919 is a compilation of American films that were released in the year 1919.

A

B

C

D

E

F

G

H

I

J

K

L

M

N

O

P–Q

R

S

T

U

V

W

Y–Z

Short films

See also 
 1919 in the United States

References

External links 

 1919 films at the Internet Movie Database

1919
Films
Lists of 1919 films by country or language
1910s in American cinema